Mascot Books is a full-service, multi-genre, independent book publisher and distributor. It is a hybrid publishing company headquartered in Herndon, Virginia, USA. The company publishes a variety of genres, including fiction, nonfiction, children's, cookbooks, and coffee table books.

History 
Naren Aryal co-founded Mascot Books in 2003 with the publication of Hello, Hokie Bird, a children's book about his alma mater's mascot, the Virginia Tech University's HokieBird. After a successful initial title, Aryal left his job as a corporate attorney to start Mascot Books. Since inception, the business has published more than 2,500 titles. Mascot Books was recently featured in The Washington Post, USA Today, and The Costco Connection.

See also 
 List of publishers
 List of book distributors
 Publishing

References

External links 
 Official website

Book publishing companies based in Virginia
Book distributors
Companies based in Fairfax County, Virginia
Herndon, Virginia
American companies established in 2003
2003 establishments in Virginia